Ishaq al-Turk was an Iranian rebel who started a rebellion in Khorasan against the Abbasid Caliphate, after the murder of Abu Muslim. Ishaq was a Zoroastrian, or a Khurramite.

After Abu Muslim's murder at the orders of al-Mansur, Ishaq fled to Transoxania, and declared a revolt on al-Mansur. He claimed that Abu Muslim was a prophet who was sent to reform Zoroastrianism, thus starting one of many movements claiming prophethood or divinity for Abu Muslim. He also claimed descent from Yahya ibn Zayd ibn Ali ibn Abi Talib. The Abbasid ruler of Khorasan had him captured and executed. His group continued to be known as al-Muslimiyya (followers of Abu Muslim Khorasani), and constitute the fundamental ideology of the sect well known as Bābak’iyyāh in the future.

He received the sobriquet "Turk" because of his frequent visits among the Turks of Transoxania.

See also 
 Bihafarid
 Ustadh Sis
 Mazdak
 Khurramites
 Sunpadh
 al-Muqanna
 Babak Khorramdin
 Afshin
 Maziar

References 

 Encyclopaedia Iranica, ESḤĀQ TORK

External links 

 Short Arabic biography

8th-century executions by the Abbasid Caliphate
Iranian rebels
History of Central Asia
Year of birth unknown
8th-century Iranian people
Rebels from the Abbasid Caliphate
8th-century people from the Abbasid Caliphate
Iranian Zoroastrians